The COSAFA Under 20 Challenge is an annual tournament for teams from Southern Africa organized by COSAFA.

Participants
Teams that can technically enter are:

 
 
 
 
 
 
 
 
 
 
 
 
 
 
 
 .

Past winners

The event scheduled for 2015 was cancelled.

References

External links
 https://www.rsssf.org/tablesc/cosafa-u20.html

 
COSAFA competitions
Under-20 association football